Chief Obafemi Jeremiah Oyeniyi Awolowo   (6 March 1909 – 9 May 1987) was a Nigerian nationalist and statesman who played a key role in Nigeria's independence movement (1957-1960). Awolowo founded the Yoruba nationalist group Egbe Omo Oduduwa, and was the first Leader of Government Business and Minister of Local Government and Finance, and first Premier of the Western Region under Nigeria's parliamentary system, from 1952 to 1959. He was the official Leader of the Opposition in the federal parliament to the Balewa government from 1959 to 1963.

As a young man he was an active journalist, editing publications such as the Nigerian worker, on top of others as well. After receiving his bachelors of commerce degree in Nigeria, he traveled to London to pursue his degree in law. Obafemi Awolowo was the first premier of the Western Region and later federal commissioner for finance, and vice chairman of the Federal Executive Council during the Nigerian Civil War. He was thrice a major contender for his country's highest office.

A native of Ikenne in Ogun State of south-western Nigeria, he started his career, like some of his well-known contemporaries, as a nationalist in the Nigerian Youth Movement in which he rose to become Western Provincial Secretary. Awolowo was responsible for much of the progressive social legislation that has made Nigeria a modern nation. In 1963 he was imprisoned under the accusations of sedition and was not pardoned by the government until 1966, after which he assumed the role as Minister of Finance. In recognition of all of this, Awolowo was the first individual in the modern era to be named as the leader of the Yorubas (Yoruba: Asíwájú Àwọn Yorùbá or Asíwájú Ọmọ Oòduà).

Early life
Obafemi Awolowo was born Jeremiah Obafemi Oyeniyi Awolowo on 6 March 1909 in the Remo town of  Ikenne, in present-day Ogun State of Nigeria. He was the only son of David Shopolu Awolowo, a farmer and sawyer, and Mary Efunyela Awolowo. He had two sisters and one maternal half-sister. Awolowo's father was born to a high chief and member of the Iwarefa, the leading faction of the traditional Osugbo group that ruled Ikenne. In 1896, Awolowo's father became one of the first Ikenne natives to convert to Christianity. Awolowo's paternal grandmother, Adefule Awolowo, whom Awolowo adored, was a devout worshipper of the Ifá. Adefule, Awolowo's grandmother, believed that Obafemi was a reincarnation of her father (his great-grandfather). Awolowo's father's conversion to Christianity often went at odds with his family's beliefs. He often challenged worshippers of the god of smallpox, Obaluaye. His father ultimately died on April 8, 1920, of smallpox when Obafemi was about eleven years old. He attended various  schools, including Baptist Boys' High School (BBHS), Abeokuta; and then became a teacher in Abeokuta, after which he qualified as a shorthand typist. Subsequently, he served as a clerk at the Wesley College Ibadan, as well as a correspondent for the Nigerian Times. It was after this that he embarked on various business ventures to help raise funds to travel to the UK for further studies. Following his education at Wesley College, Ibadan, in 1927, he enrolled at the University of London as an External Student and graduated with the degree of Bachelor of Commerce (Hons.). He went to the UK in 1944 to study law at the University of London and was called to the Bar by the Honorable Society of the Inner Temple on 19 November 1946. In 1949, Awolowo founded the Nigerian Tribune, a private Nigerian newspaper, which he used to spread nationalist consciousness among Nigerians.

Politics
Awolowo was Nigeria's foremost federalist. In his Path to Nigerian Freedom (1947) – the first systematic federalist manifesto by a Nigerian politician – he advocated federalism as the only basis for equitable national integration and, as head of the Action Group, he led demands for a federal constitution, which was introduced in the 1954 Lyttleton Constitution, following primarily the model proposed by the Western Region delegation led by him. As premier, he proved to be and was viewed as a man of vision and a dynamic administrator. Awolowo was also the country's leading social democratic politician. He supported limited public ownership and limited central planning in government. He believed that the state should channel Nigeria's resources into education and state-led infrastructural development. Controversially, and at considerable expense, he introduced free primary education for all and free health care for children in the Western Region, established the first television service in Africa in 1959, and the Oduduwa Group, all of which were financed from the highly lucrative cocoa industry which was the mainstay of the regional economy.

More about Obafemi Awolowo
From the eve of independence, he led the Action Group as the Leader of the Opposition in the federal parliament, leaving Samuel Ladoke Akintola as the Western Region Premier. Disagreements between Awolowo and Akintola on how to run the Western region led the latter to an alliance with the Tafawa Balewa-led NPC federal government. A constitutional crisis led to the declaration of a state of emergency in the Western Region, eventually resulting in a widespread breakdown of law and order.

Excluded from national government, Awolowo and his party faced an increasingly precarious position. Akintola's followers, angered at their exclusion from power, formed the Nigerian National Democratic Party (NNDP) under Akintola's leadership. Having previously suspended the elected Western Regional Assembly, the federal government then reconstituted the body after manoeuvres that brought Akintola's NNDP into power without an election. Shortly afterwards Awolowo and several disciples were arrested, charged, convicted (of treason), and jailed for conspiring with the Ghanaian authorities under Balewa to overthrow the federal government. In 1979 and 1983, he contested under  the Unity Party's  platform as a presidential candidate,but  lost to the northern-based National Party of Shehu ShagariLegacy.

In 1992, the Obafemi Awolowo Foundation was founded as an independent, non-profit, non-partisan organisation committed to furthering the symbiotic interaction of public policy and relevant scholarship with a view to promoting the overall development of the Nigerian nation. The Foundation was launched by the President of Nigeria at that time, General Ibrahim Babangida, at the Liberty Stadium, Ibadan. 
However, his most important bequests (styled Awoism) are his exemplary integrity, his welfarism, his contributions to hastening the process of decolonisation and his  consistent and reasoned advocacy of federalism-based on ethno-linguistic self-determination and uniting politically strong states-as the best basis for Nigerian unity. Awolowo died peacefully at his Ikenne home, the Efunyela Hall (so named after his mother), on 9 May 1987, at the age of 78 and was laid to rest in Ikenne, amid tributes across political and ethno-religious divides.

Honours of obafemi awolowo
He is featured in the 100 Naira banknote since 1999.

In addition to a variety of other chieftaincy titles, Chief Awolowo held the title of the Odole Oodua of Ile-Ife. he is loved by 99% of Yorubas

Bibliography
Path to Nigerian Freedom 
Awo – Autobiography of Chief Obafemi Awolowo
My Early Life
Thoughts on the Nigerian Constitution
The People's Republic
The Strategy & Tactics of the People's Republic of Nigeria
The Problems of Africa – The Need for Ideological Appraisal
Awo on the Nigerian Civil War
Path to Nigerian Greatness
Voice of Reason
Voice of Courage
Voice of Wisdom
Adventures in Power – Book 1 – My March Through Prison
Adventures in Power – Book 2 – Travails of Democracy
My march through prison
Socialism in the service of New Nigeria
Selected speeches of Chief Obafemi Awolowo
Philosophy of Independent Nigeria
Memorable Quotes from Awo
The Path to Economic Freedom in Developing Country
Blueprint for Post-War Reconstruction
Anglo-Nigerian Military Pact Agreement

See also

Ikenne Residence of Chief Obafemi Awolowo

References

1909 births
1987 deaths
20th-century Nigerian politicians
Action Group (Nigeria) politicians
Nigerian Christian socialists
Alumni of University of London Worldwide
Egbe Omo Oduduwa politicians
State governors of Nigeria
Grand Commanders of the Order of the Federal Republic
Nigerian democracy activists
Nigerian newspaper founders
Nigerian Pentecostals
Nigerian social democrats
Nigerian socialists
People convicted of treason against Nigeria
People from Ogun State
People of the Nigerian Civil War
Senior Advocates of Nigeria
Yoruba politicians
Yoruba legal professionals
Obafemi
People from colonial Nigeria
Ahmadu Bello University people
Obafemi Awolowo University people
20th-century Nigerian lawyers
Nigerian revolutionaries
Candidates in the 1979 Nigerian presidential election
Candidates in the 1983 Nigerian presidential election
Burials in Ogun State
Anglican socialists
Finance ministers of Nigeria
Members of the Inner Temple
Baptist Boys' High School alumni
Members of the Fabian Society
Nigerian independence activists